Sincerely Daisy is a 2020 Kenyan coming-of-age romantic comedy film produced and directed by popular actor Nick Mutuma. The film stars Ella Maina, Brian Abejah, Sam Psenjen and Mbeki Mwalimu in the lead roles. The film was released in Netflix on 9 October 2020 and became the first ever Kenyan feature film to be released via Netflix. It is also the second Kenyan film to be released in the platform after short film Poacher. The film became one of the highly anticipated films in Netflix after its trailer was released on 2 September 2020.

Plot 
The film revolves around the life of a happy high school graduate (Daisy) played by Ella Maina, whose dreams, expectations, passion and confidence are significantly affected by family and romantic drama.

Cast 

 Ellah Maina as Daisy
 Brian Abejah as Collo
 Sam Psenjen as Fred
 James Webbo
 Serah Wanjiru as Amina
 Francis Ouma as Kyalo Mistari
 Kagambi Nass
 Mbeki Mwalimu as Wendy 
 Foi Wambui as Lisa
 Muthoni Gathecha

Production 
Principal photography began in November 2019. It marked the second directorial venture for Nick Mutuma after You Again. The film was made at The Next Superstar, a popular talent competition in Kenya and most of the contestants who featured in the talent competition were cast in the film. The film was shot and completed within just seven days. The soundtrack of the film is by Kenyan music producer Timothy Rimbui.

See also 

 List of Kenyan films

References

External links 

 

2020 films
2020 romantic comedy films
2020s coming-of-age comedy films
Kenyan comedy films
English-language Kenyan films
2020s English-language films